John B. Reilly (May 18, 1870 – November 15, 1928) was the first Mayor of Miami.

John B. Reilly was born in Connecticut on May 18, 1870. In 1886, he became a shipping clerk in Branford, Connecticut. He moved to Florida in 1893 accepting the position of bookkeeper and cashier for the firm of McQuire & McDonald, who contracted with Henry M. Flagler and built his hotels. He was then appointed as a manager of Florida East Coast Railway in 1896 and acted as company spokesman in Miami, Florida. The city was incorporated shortly after his arrival and due to his key role with the Florida East Coast Railway he was elected mayor in 1896 serving four consecutive terms. He also served as United States Commissioner for the southern district of Florida being appointed in 1897. In March, 1914, he became associated with the developments of James Deering's Summer House Villa Vizcaya and acted as financial agent until 1921. He was director of the Bank of Bay Biscayne, director of Reilly, Stoms & Paxton and a director of Miami Realty Corporation.

References
Notes

Bibliography

 

1870 births
Mayors of Miami
Politicians from New Haven, Connecticut
1928 deaths
People from Branford, Connecticut